Saybrook may refer to:

Places
Saybrook Colony (1635–1644), later merged with what is now the State of Connecticut
Old Saybrook, Connecticut
Saybrook, Illinois, a village
Saybrook Township, Ashtabula County, Ohio and the unincorporated crossroads of Saybrook in the township

Education
Saybrook College, one of the 14 residential colleges at Yale University in New Haven, Connecticut
Saybrook University (originally the Humanistic Psychology Institute, and later Saybrook Graduate School and Research Center), a California university specializing in psychology, organizational systems, and human science

See also 
 Marty Saybrooke, a fictional character